Klocke is a surname of German origin. Notable people with the surname include:

Jörg Klocke (born 1960), West German long jumper
Piet Klocke (born 1957), German musician, cabaret artist, author and actor

References

Surnames of German origin